Nathaniel Knowles Savino (born January 24, 2002) is an American professional baseball pitcher in the Arizona Diamondbacks organization.

Amateur career
Savino attended Potomac Falls High School in Sterling, Virginia. In 2019, he batted .375 and pitched to a 0.60 ERA and was named the Gatorade Virginia Baseball Player of the Year. That summer, he played in the Under Armour All-America Baseball Game at Wrigley Field and the Perfect Game All-American Classic at Petco Park. He graduated from Potomac Falls early in December of 2019 and then enrolled at the University of Virginia to play college baseball.

In 2020, Savino's freshman year at Virginia, he pitched  innings in which he compiled a 1.93 ERA before remainder of the season was cancelled due to the COVID-19 pandemic. In 2021, Savino appeared in 16 games (ten starts) in which he went 3-3 with a 3.79 ERA and 34 strikeouts over  innings. Following the season's end, he was named to the USA Baseball Collegiate National Team. Savino entered the 2022 season as Virginia's number two starter, and was named the ACC Pitcher of the Week on March 14 after throwing a complete game shutout versus Duke University. He finished the season having started 15 games with a 6-6 record, a 3.69 ERA, and 79 strikeouts over 78 innings.

Professional career
Savino was drafted by the Arizona Diamondbacks in the third round with the 82nd overall selection of the 2022 Major League Baseball draft. He signed with the team for $700,000.

References

External links
Virginia Cavaliers bio

2001 births
Living people
Baseball players from Virginia
Baseball pitchers
Virginia Cavaliers baseball players
United States national baseball team players